is a city located in Ibaraki Prefecture, Japan. , the city had an estimated population of 27,577 in 10,849 households and a population density of 386 persons per km². The percentage of the population aged over 65 was 32.9%. It is known for its annual iris festival (Itako Ayame Matsuri). Much of the city is within the borders of the Suigo-Tsukuba Quasi-National Park.

Geography
Itako is located in southern Ibaraki Prefecture, bordered by Chiba Prefecture to the south, and sandwiched between Lake Kasumigaura to the west and Lake Kitaura to the east. The Tone River also flows through the city, which has been noted since the Edo period for its network of canals. The city is approximately 80 kilometers north of Tokyo.

Surrounding municipalities
Ibaraki Prefecture
 Kashima
 Inashiki
Kamisu
 Namegata
Chiba Prefecture
Katori

Climate
Itako has a Humid continental climate (Köppen Cfa) characterized by warm summers and cool winters with light snowfall.  The average annual temperature in Itako is 14.5 °C. The average annual rainfall is 1455 mm with September as the wettest month. The temperatures are highest on average in August, at around 25.9 °C, and lowest in January, at around 4.3 °C.

Demographics
Per Japanese census data, the population of Itako peaked around the year 2000 and has declined slightly since.

History
The town of Itako was established within Namegata District with the creation of the modern municipalities system on April 1, 1889. Itako merged with the neighboring villages of Tsuwa, Nobukata and Ouhara on February 11, 1955. It was raised to city status on April 1, 2001, by absorbing the town of Ushibori.

Government
Itako has a mayor-council form of government with a directly elected mayor and a unicameral city council of 16 members. Itako contributes one member to the Ibaraki Prefectural Assembly. In terms of national politics, the city is part of Ibaraki 2nd district of the lower house of the Diet of Japan.

Economy

Education
Itako has six public elementary schools and four public middle schools operated by the city government, and one public high school operated by the Ibaraki Prefectural Board of Education.

Transportation

Railway
 JR East – Kashima Line
 –

Bus
 Suigō-Itako Bus Terminal

Highway
   – Itako IC

Local attractions
Suigo Itako Iris Gardens
Junikyo Bridges
Kongenyama park
Nihonmatsu-dera Buddhist temple
Inariyama Park
Chōshō-ji Buddhist temple
Suigo Hokusai Park
Road Station Itako
Suigo Dragonfly Park

Notable people from Itako 
Kenji Koyano, professional football player
Keita Sugimoto, professional football player
Tatsuya Kawahara, professional football player
Mitsuo Yanagimachi, movie director

References

External links

Official Website 

Cities in Ibaraki Prefecture
Populated places established in 1955
1955 establishments in Japan
Itako, Ibaraki